URSAL (acronym in Portuguese for "Union of Socialist Republics of Latin America") is a jocular term coined in 2001 by Brazilian sociologist Maria Lúcia Victor Barbosa to mock criticism of left-wing politicians and intellectuals by the Free Trade Area of the Americas led by the United States. Subsequently the expression was taken seriously by Olavo de Carvalho and by Brazilian right-wingers, resurfacing on YouTube and other media as a globalist plan related to a supposed Latin American integration plan propagated by the São Paulo Forum.

In 2018 the Brazilian federal deputy and presidential candidate, Cabo Daciolo, spoke of URSAL as a plan to end national sovereignties on the continent. Daciolo referred to URSAL when he questioned  Ciro Gomes during the first debate among candidates of the 2018 Brazilian presidential election. Daciolo said URSAL would be a federation of Latin American and Caribbean countries with characteristics of a large bloc of socialist republics.

During Jair Bolsonaro's visit to London for Queen Elizabeth II's funeral in 2022, after a speech in which he was criticized for not respecting the moment of mourning, one member of a group criticizing his presence in London was wrongly arrested and subsequently released after an anonymous report to the police, allegedly about someone wearing a red t-shirt which displayed the URSAL acronym.

See also 
 Socialism in Brazil
 Cultural Marxism conspiracy theory
 Prometheism
 Patria Grande, another concept for a united Latin America

References

Further reading 

 BOMFIM, Manoel. A América Latina: males de origem. Ed. do centenário. Rio de Janeiro: Topbooks, 2005. 390 p.

External links 
 Programa Pensamento Crítico - Pátria Grande (E58). Video produced by the Institute of Latin American Studies of the Federal University of Santa Catarina. In the episode, Nildo Ouriques and Waldir Rampinelli discuss the idea of Great Nation, raised in the presidential debate under the name of URSAL.

Foro de São Paulo
Conspiracy theories in Brazil
Hoaxes
Political catchphrases
Pages containing links to subscription-only content